"Who Am I? (What's My Name?)" (commonly titled "What's My Name?") is the debut solo single by American rapper Snoop Doggy Dogg, released on November 11, 1993 as the debut single from his first album, Doggystyle (1993), with the record labels Death Row and Interscope Records. The song, produced by Dr. Dre, features samples and interpolations from George Clinton's "Atomic Dog" in its chorus and throughout, the bass line from Funkadelic's (Not Just) Knee Deep and an interpolation from Parliament's "Give Up the Funk (Tear the Roof off the Sucker)" in its bridge. The song's intro contains a sample from The Counts' "Pack of Lies." A vocal sample ("the bomb") from Parliament's "P. Funk (Wants to Get Funked Up)" can be heard throughout. 

The song and music video were parodied in director Rusty Cundieff's film, Fear of a Black Hat (1993). In the UK in 2014, the song was used on an advert for MoneySupermarket, which featured Snoop Dogg. It was ranked number 456 on NMEs "500 Greatest Songs of All Time".

Critical reception
Alan Jones from Music Week gave the song four out of five, naming it Pick of the Week. He wrote, "Clearly influenced by George Clinton, Cameo and the like, this laidback rap cut has been widely praised with the industry has a gimmick warcry, some soulful femmes and stands every chance of being a hit." Ralph Tee from the RM Dance Update complimented "its infectious "Bow wow wow yippy yo yippy yeah" hook and a production steeped in the tradition of Seventies George Clinton and Cameo". He stated that "it's Snoop's rhymes and the aforementioned hook that's making this a smash". Charles Aaron from Spin commented, "There's a big diff between asking "Who Am I?" and being prepared for conflicting answers from your audience, and asking "What's My Name?" and having yet another fucking George Clinton sample reinforce your ego."

Commercial performance 
"Who Am I? (What's My Name?)" was the first top 10 hit of Snoop Dogg on the  Billboard Hot 100, the first as a lead rap artist. The song reached number eight on the chart. The song topped the US Hot Rap Songs for three weeks. It was certified gold by the Recording Industry Association of America (RIAA) in 1994.

Music video
Fab Five Freddy directs a CGI-driven music video for the song. Snoop and others (Kurupt, Daz Dillinger, and Warren G) are able to transform into dogs (such as Doberman Pinschers, Rottweilers, Pit bulls, and the women Cocker Spaniels and several other breeds) to evade upsetting fathers and run wild, while also evading a pair of clumsy dog catchers while in these forms. One scene shows the dogs wearing sunglasses, smoking cigars and gambling on dice games (a parody of the late 19th century/early 20th century series of paintings by Cassius Marcellus Coolidge titled Dogs Playing Poker). Throughout the video Snoop can be seen standing on the roof of V.I.P. Records, a record store and studio where Snoop Dogg recorded some of his first material. Snoop's girlfriend in the video was played by now-clinical nurse liaison Athena Germany, who later appeared in Family Feud with rest of her family in 2021.

Track listing
 CD single
 "Who Am I? (What's My Name?)" (clean radio mix) — 4:15	
 "Who Am I? (What's My Name?)" (clean club mix) — 5:03 	
 "Who Am I? (What's My Name?)" (explicit club mix) — 8:12	
 "Who Am I? (What's My Name?)" (LP version) — 4:15 	
 "Who Am I? (What's My Name?)" (instrumental) — 4:15

Charts

Weekly charts

Year-end charts

Certifications

Release history

See also
 List of Billboard Hot 100 top 10 singles in 1994

References

1993 songs
1993 debut singles
Death Row Records singles
Interscope Records singles
Fiction about shapeshifting
Snoop Dogg songs
Song recordings produced by Dr. Dre
Songs about dogs
Songs written by Dr. Dre
Songs written by Garry Shider
Songs written by George Clinton (funk musician)
Songs written by Snoop Dogg